The 64th National Film Awards was an award ceremony during which the Directorate of Film Festivals presents its annual National Film Awards to honour the best films of 2016 in the Indian cinema. The awards were announced on 7 April 2017, and the ceremony was held on 3 May 2017.

Selection process 
The Directorate of Film Festivals invited online entries for the first time on 16 January 2017 and the acceptable last date for entries was until 21 January 2017. Feature and Non-Feature Films certified by Central Board of Film Certification between 1 January 2016, and 31 December 2016, were eligible for the film award categories. Books, critical studies, reviews or articles on cinema published in Indian newspapers, magazines, and journals between 1 January 2016, and 31 December 2016, were eligible for the best writing on cinema section. Entries of dubbed, revised or copied versions of a film or translation, abridgements, edited or annotated works and reprints were ineligible for the awards.

For the Feature and Non-Feature Films sections, films in any Indian language, shot on 16 mm, 35 mm, a wider film gauge or a digital format, and released in cinemas, on video or digital formats for home viewing were eligible. Films were required to be certified as a feature film, a featurette or a Documentary/Newsreel/Non-Fiction by the Central Board of Film Certification.

Best Film-Friendly State 
The awards aim at encouraging study and appreciation of cinema as an art form and dissemination of information and critical appreciation of this art-form through a state government policy.
Jury members

Golden Lotus Award 
Official name: Swarna Kamal

All the awardees are awarded with 'Golden Lotus Award (Swarna Kamal)'.

Dadasaheb Phalke Award 
Introduced in 1969, the Dadasaheb Phalke Award is the highest award given to recognise the contributions of film personalities towards the development of Indian cinema and for distinguished contributions to the medium, its growth and promotion."

A committee consisting five eminent personalities from Indian film industry was appointed to evaluate the lifetime achievement award, Dadasaheb Phalke Award. Following were the jury members:

 Jury members

Feature films 

Feature films will be awarded at All India as well as regional level. Following will be the awards given in each category:

Jury 

For the Feature Film section, six committees were formed based on the different geographic regions in India. The two-tier evaluation process included a central committee and five regional committees. The central committee, headed by the director Priyadarshan, included the heads of each regional committee and five other jury members. At regional level, each committee consisted of one chief and four members. The chief and one non-chief member of each regional committee were selected from outside that geographic region. The table below names the jury members for the central and regional committees:

Central jury

Northern region: 

Eastern region: 

Western region: 

Southern region I: 

Southern region II:

All India Award 

Following will be the awards given:

Golden Lotus Award 

Official name: Swarna Kamal

All the awardees are awarded with 'Golden Lotus Award (Swarna Kamal)', a certificate and cash prize.

Silver Lotus Award 

Official name: Rajat Kamal

All the awardees are awarded with 'Silver Lotus Award (Rajat Kamal)', a certificate and cash prize.

Regional awards 

National Film Awards are also given to the best films in the regional languages of India. Awards for the regional languages are categorised as per their mention in the eighth schedule of the Constitution of India. Awardees included producers and directors of the film. No films in languages other than those specified in the Schedule VIII of the Constitution were eligible.

Best Feature Film in Each of the Language Other Than Those Specified in the Schedule VIII of the Constitution

Non-feature films 

Short Films made in any Indian language and certified by the central board of Film Certification as a documentary/newsreel/fiction are eligible for non-feature film section.

Jury 
A committee of seven, headed by Raju Mishra, was appointed to evaluate the Non-Feature Films entries. The jury members were:

Golden Lotus Award 

Official name: Swarna Kamal

All awardees are awarded with 'Golden Lotus Award (Swarna Kamal)', a certificate and cash prize.

Silver Lotus Award 

Official name: Rajat Kamal

All the Awardees are awarded with 'Silver Lotus Award (Rajat Kamal)' and cash prize.

Best Writing on Cinema 

The awards aim at encouraging study and appreciation of cinema as an art form and dissemination of information and critical appreciation of this art-form through publication of books, articles, reviews etc.

Jury 
A committee of three, headed by the National Award-winning writer Bhavana Somaya was appointed to evaluate the nominations for the best writing on Indian cinema. The jury members were as follows:

Golden Lotus Award 
Official name: Swarna Kamal

All the awardees are awarded with the Golden Lotus Award (Swarna Kamal) accompanied with a cash prize.

Controversy 
There was controversy over the National Film Award for Best Actor, which the committee awarded to Akshay Kumar for his performance in Rustom, snubbing Aamir Khan's performance for Dangal. Committee member Priyadarshan, who has worked with Kumar on several films, gave the following explanation for awarding Kumar instead of Khan:

References

External links 
 64th National Film Awards: Official Catalogue
 National Film Awards Archives
 Official Page for Directorate of Film Festivals, India

National Film Awards (India) ceremonies
2017 Indian film awards